Giant Surface Music Falling to Earth Like Jewels from the Sky is the debut studio album of Yume Bitsu, released in 1998 by Ba Da Bing Records.

Track listing

Personnel 
Adapted from the Giant Surface Music Falling to Earth Like Jewels from the Sky liner notes.
Yume Bitsu
 Jason Anderson – drums
 Alex Bundy – sampler, production, recording
 Adam Forkner – vocals, guitar, keyboards, producer, recording
 Franz Prichard – guitar

Release history

References

External links 
 Giant Surface Music Falling to Earth Like Jewels from the Sky at Discogs (list of releases)

1998 debut albums
Yume Bitsu albums
Ba Da Bing Records albums
Albums produced by Adam Forkner